Leslie Thomas (1931–2014) was a British author

Leslie or Les Thomas may also refer to:

Les Thomas, Welsh rugby union and rugby league footballer who played in the 1940s
Les Thomas (footballer) (1906–1997), Australian footballer for Collingwood
Leslie Thomas (politician) (1906–1971), British Conservative politician
Leslie Thomas (barrister) (born 1965), British barrister